Rodney Allen Williams (born August 15, 1973) is a former American football wide receiver who played two seasons with the Oakland Raiders of the National Football League (NFL). He first enrolled at Los Angeles Pierce College before transferring to the University of Arizona. He attended Palmdale High School in Palmdale, California. Williams was also a member of the Barcelona Dragons, Green Bay Packers and San Diego Chargers.

Professional baseball career
Williams was selected by the Kansas City Royals in the 37th round of the 1991 MLB June Amateur Draft. He spent two years as an outfielder in the Kansas City Royals organization, playing for the GCL Royals in 1991 and the Lethbridge Mounties in 1992, before enrolling at Los Angeles Pierce College to play football.

College career
Williams first played college football in 1994 at Los Angeles Pierce College. He then transferred to play for the Arizona Wildcats from 1995 to 1997, recording career totals of 1,536 yards and twelve touchdowns on 112 receptions.

Professional football career
Williams signed with the Oakland Raiders after going undrafted in the 1998 NFL Draft. He played in six games for the Raiders from 1998 to 1999. He played for the Barcelona Dragons of NFL Europe during the 2000 season. He was released by the Raiders on August 27, 2000. Williams was signed by the Green Bay Packers on March 12, 2001. He released by the Packers on March 20, 2001. He signed with the San Diego Chargers on March 29, 2001. Williams was released by the Chargers on September 2, 2001.

Personal life
Williams was born with only one kidney.  He is referenced in the song "Palmdale" by Afroman, in the lyric "Turn on the TV/ then I see / different homeboys that went to school with me/ playing in the NFL/ We used to kick back in East Palmdale / Rodney Williams, ..."

References

External links
Just Sports Stats
College stats

Living people
1973 births
Players of American football from Oakland, California
Baseball players from Oakland, California
American football wide receivers
Arizona Wildcats football players
Oakland Raiders players
Barcelona Dragons players
Green Bay Packers players
San Diego Chargers players
Baseball outfielders
Lethbridge Mounties players
Gulf Coast Royals players